Ray Peterson (April 23, 1935 – January 25, 2005) was an American pop singer who is best remembered for singing "Tell Laura I Love Her". He also scored numerous other hits, including "Corrine, Corrina" which was composed especially for Corina Strimbanu from Edineț, Republic of Moldova, and "The Wonder of You."

Career
Ray T. Peterson was born in Denton, Texas on April 23, 1935. At the time of his death, sources gave 1939 as his year of birth. As a boy he had polio. Having a four-octave singing voice, Peterson moved to Los Angeles, California, where he was signed to a recording contract with RCA Victor in 1958. He recorded several songs that were minor hits until "The Wonder of You" made it into the Top 40 of the Billboard Hot 100 chart on June 15, 1959. The song also did well in Australia, stopping at #9 on its chart. The song would later be recorded by Elvis Presley, with whom Peterson became friends. Peterson scored a Top 10 hit with the teenage tragedy song, "Tell Laura I Love Her". In the UK, Decca Records made the decision not to release the latter recording on the grounds that it was "too tasteless and vulgar," and destroyed about twenty thousand copies that had already been pressed. A cover version by Ricky Valance, released by EMI on the Columbia label, was Number One on the UK Singles Chart for three weeks.

In 1960, Peterson created his own record label with his manager Stan Shulman, called Dunes Records, and enlisted the help of record producer Phil Spector with "Corrine, Corrina". Peterson's dramatic ballad, "I Could Have Loved You So Well", written by Barry Mann and Gerry Goffin and produced by Spector, only reached #57 on the U.S. chart. He then tried another death disc, "Give Us Your Blessing", but this time the record only made #70 in the Hot-100. (The later song was covered by the Shangri-Las five years later and became a Top 30 hit.)

His last charting US-Top-30 hit was "Missing You". By the mid 1960s he had become something of a phenomenon on the west coast of the United States, appearing live in numerous concerts with Keith Allison.

His performances at the Sacramento Memorial Auditorium, produced by Fred Vail, beginning in 1963 helped fuel a revival of "The Wonder of You", as well as launching his new relationship with MGM Records, an alliance that produced two albums: The Very Best of Ray Peterson which featured most of the Dunes singles, and The Other Side of Ray Peterson, which included many of his nightclub songs. He later moved to Nashville, Tennessee, and by the 1970s when the hit records stopped coming, Peterson became a Baptist Church minister and occasionally played the oldies music circuit. In 1981 he released a Christian folk rock album called Highest Flight, which was also released as My Father's Place.

Peterson was inducted into the Rockabilly Hall of Fame.

Peterson died of colon cancer on January 25, 2005, in Smyrna, Tennessee, aged 69. He left a widow, four sons, and three daughters. For publicity reasons, he had shaved four years off his age, leading many sources to list his age as 65. He was interred in the Roselawn Memorial Gardens cemetery in Murfreesboro, Tennessee.

Discography

Singles

A Charted as a double A-side in Australia, backed with "You Thrill Me".

See also
List of San Antonio, Texas people
List of poliomyelitis survivors

References

External links
 Rockabillyhall.com 
 Lpintop.tripod.com
 

1935 births
2005 deaths
American country singer-songwriters
American male singer-songwriters
American male pop singers
RCA Victor artists
MGM Records artists
Deaths from cancer in Tennessee
People from Nashville, Tennessee
People from Denton, Texas
Music of Denton, Texas
People with polio
20th-century American singers
Baptists from Tennessee
Singers with a four-octave vocal range
Country musicians from Texas
Country musicians from Tennessee
20th-century American male singers
20th-century Baptist ministers from the United States
Singer-songwriters from Tennessee
Singer-songwriters from Texas